Harper is an unincorporated community in Albany County, Wyoming, United States.

The 1916 edition of The Complete Official Road Guide of the Lincoln Highway describes Harper as containing a railroad station with "no tourist accommodations. Railroad section house. Drinking water, radiator water, camp site." There was once a small coal mine near Harper, but it closed after a rush of water drove the workers away.

References

Unincorporated communities in Albany County, Wyoming
Unincorporated communities in Wyoming